James Smith VC (1871 – 18 March 1946) was an English recipient of the Victoria Cross, the highest and most prestigious award for gallantry in the face of the enemy that can be awarded to British and Commonwealth forces.

Smith was about 26 years old, and a corporal in The Buffs (East Kent Regiment), British Army during the First Mohmand Campaign, British India when the following deed took place for which he was awarded the VC.

On the night of 16/17 September 1897, in the Mamund Valley, North-West India, Corporal Smith, with other men, responded to a call for volunteers and followed two officers of the Royal Engineers (James Morris Colquhoun Colvin and Thomas Colclough Watson) into the burning village of Bilot, in an attempt to dislodge the enemy. Afterwards, although wounded, Corporal Smith continued fighting steadily and coolly, and also helped to carry the wounded to the place prepared for them. When one of the officers left in order to get help, the corporal held the position until his return, exposing himself to great danger and directing the fire of his men.

He later achieved the rank of colour-Sergeant. He is buried in Watling Street Cemetery in Dartford, Kent

His Victoria Cross was on display at The Buffs Regimental Museum, Canterbury, England. With the rest of that museum's collections, it has now been transferred to the National Army Museum in Chelsea, London.

References

Publications
Monuments to Courage (David Harvey, 1999)
The Register of the Victoria Cross (This England, 1997)

External links
Location of grave and VC medal (Kent)

1871 births
1946 deaths
Buffs (Royal East Kent Regiment) soldiers
British recipients of the Victoria Cross
People from Maidstone
British military personnel of the First Mohmand Campaign
British military personnel of the Chitral Expedition
British Army recipients of the Victoria Cross
Military personnel from Kent
Burials in Kent